Carlos Espinosa de los Monteros y Bernaldo de Quirós, 4th Marquis of Valtierra (born 1944) is a Spanish peer, executive and civil servant. He is the father of politician Iván Espinosa de los Monteros.

Biography 
He was born on 18 March 1944 in Madrid. He is son of Francisco Javier Espinosa de los Monteros y Herreros de Tejada and Galinda de la Guardia Bernaldo de Quirós y Alcalá Galiano.

He obtained a degree in law at the Complutense University of Madrid (1965) and in Business Administration at the ICADE (1966), and later an MBA at Northwestern University. He joined the Corps of Commercial Technicians of the State in 1969. On 30 March 1970, Espinosa de los Monteros married María Eugenia de Simón y Vallarino, whom he has had 5 children with, including Beltrán, CFO of Stradivarius, and Iván (b. 1971), Vice-Secretary for Foreign Relations of the far-right party Vox.

He served as vice-president of the Instituto Nacional de Industria (INI). Espinosa de los Monteros became Chairman of Iberia and Aviaco in 1983, leaving both posts in March 1985. He inherited the nobiliary title of Marquis of Valtierra from his father in 1985. From 1988 to 2009 he served as chairman and CEO of Mercedes Benz Spain.

In 2012, Espinosa de los Monteros—serving by the time as vice-president of Inditex—was appointed by the Government of Mariano Rajoy to the post of High Commissioner for the 'Marca España' ("Brand Spain"), tasked with the representation of private firms abroad through financement from funds of the Ministry of Foreign Affairs. He was sworn in on 12 July 2012. Following the accession of Pedro Sánchez to the post of Prime Minister in June 2018, he was removed from office in October 2018, with the High Commissariat replaced by the Secretariat of State for Global Spain.

Decorations 
 Grand Cross of the Order of Civil Merit (2009)
 Sash of the Order of the Aztec Eagle (2015)
 Grand Cross of the Order of Isabella the Catholic (2018)

Ancestry

References 

1944 births
Spanish businesspeople
Living people